Days Creek is an unincorporated community and census-designated place in Douglas County, Oregon, United States. At the 2010 census it had a population of 272.

The community was named after the local creek, which in turn was named for Patrick and George Day, who settled near its mouth in 1851. The post office was established in 1878 as "Day's Creek", but the name was changed to "Days Creek" c. 1890.

Geography
The community of Days Creek is located on Oregon Route 227, at the confluence of Days Creek and the South Umpqua River.

Demographics

Climate
This region experiences warm (but not hot) and dry summers, with no average monthly temperatures above .  According to the Köppen Climate Classification system, Days Creek has a warm-summer Mediterranean climate, abbreviated "Csb" on climate maps.

Notable people

Rick Foster, classical guitarist

References

External links
Days Creek School District 15

Unincorporated communities in Douglas County, Oregon
Census-designated places in Oregon
1878 establishments in Oregon
Populated places established in 1878
Census-designated places in Douglas County, Oregon
Unincorporated communities in Oregon